Lepcha language, or Róng language (Róng ríng), is a Himalayish language spoken by the Lepcha people in Sikkim, India and parts of West Bengal, Nepal and Bhutan.

Despite spirited attempts to preserve the language, Lepcha has already effectively been lost everywhere in favour of Nepali. 
The United Nations Educational, Scientific and Cultural Organization (UNESCO) lists Lepcha as an endangered language with the following characterization:

The Lepcha language is spoken in Sikkim and Darjeeling district in West Bengal of India. The 1991 Indian census counted 39,342 speakers of Lepcha. Lepcha is considered to be one of the indigenous languages of the area in which it is spoken. Unlike most other languages of the Himalayas, the Lepcha people have their own indigenous script (the world's largest collection of old Lepcha manuscripts is kept in Leiden, with over 180 Lepcha books).

Lepcha is the language of instruction in some schools in Sikkim. In comparison to other Tibeto-Burman languages, it has been given considerable attention in the literature. Nevertheless, many important aspects of the Lepcha language and culture still remain undescribed.

There are very few remaining households where the younger generation actively speaks the language, and these households are few and far between. The entire Lepcha area is bilingual. Revitalization efforts are minimum and have had no major impact in conserving the language where it was indigenously spoken. Dwindling population and culture loss have rendered the use of Lepcha superficial and it's importance has remained confined to only where cultural and ceremonial activities where it is required as a part of a tradition is endured.

Population
Lepcha is spoken by minorities in the Indian states of Sikkim and West Bengal, as well as parts of Nepal and Bhutan. Where it is spoken, it is considered to be an aboriginal language, pre-dating the arrival of the Tibetan languages (Sikkimese, Dzongkha, and others) and more recent Nepali language. Lepcha speakers comprise four distinct communities: the Renjóngmú of Sikkim; the Támsángmú of Kalimpong, Kurseong, and Mirik; the ʔilámmú of Ilam District, Nepal; and the Promú of southwestern Bhutan. Lepcha-speaking groups in India are larger than those in Nepal and Bhutan.

The Indian census reported 50,000 Lepcha speakers, however the number of native Lepcha speakers in India may be closer to 30,000.

Classification
Lepcha is difficult to classify, but George van Driem (2001) suggests that it may be closest to the Mahakiranti languages, a subfamily of the Himalayish languages.

Lepcha is internally diverse, showing lexical influences from different majority language groups across the four main Lepcha communities. According to Plaisier (2007), these Nepali and Sikkimese Tibetan influences do not amount to a dialectical difference.

Roger Blench (2013) suggests that Lepcha has an Austroasiatic substratum, which originated from a now-extinct branch of Austroasiatic that he calls "Rongic".

Features
Lepcha is a non-tonal Sino-Tibetan language, although it does have phonemic stress or pitch that may be marked in the Lepcha script. Much of its lexicon is composed of monosyllabic elements.

Notably, words that are commonly considered obscene or taboo in other languages are not treated as such by native speakers.

Script and romanization

The Lepcha script (also known as "róng") is a syllabic script featuring a variety of special marks and ligatures. Its genealogy is unclear. Early Lepcha manuscripts were written vertically, a sign of Chinese influence. Prior to the development of the Lepcha script, Lepcha literary works were composed in the Tibetan script.

Lepcha language is romanized according to varying schemes, the prevailing system being that of Mainwaring (1876). Most linguists, including Plaisier (2007), whose system is used in this article, have followed modified versions of Mainwaring's system. Other linguists and historians have used systems based on European languages such as English, French, and German.

Phonology

Consonants
Lepcha consonants appear in the chart below, following Plaisier (2007):

Retroflex phonemes /ʈ/, /ʈʰ/, and /ɖ/ are written in Lepcha script as ᰀᰥkr, ᰝᰥ hr, and ᰃᰥ gr, respectively. Most, though not all, instances of retroflex consonants indicate a word is of Tibetan origin. To distinguish this retroflex sound in Lepcha script, a dot may be written underneath: ᰀᰥ᰷, ᰝᰥ᰷, and ᰃᰥ᰷.

Notably, syllables with the glide  are given their own independent forms in the Lepcha script.

Of the above phonemes, only , and  may be syllable-final. In syllable-final position, stops are realized as an unreleased stop, usually pronounced with a simultaneous : for example,  becomes .

Vowels
According to Plaisier (2007), Lepcha has eight vowels:

Distinctions between /o/ and /ɔ/ are often lost among non-literate speakers, particularly those highly fluent in Nepali language, which does not contrast the sounds.

Grammar
Lepcha grammar features nouns, pronouns, adjectives, adverbs, and verbs. Word order is typically subject–object–verb (SOV). Lepcha morphology is somewhat agglutinative, though most bare Lepcha lexicon is made up of one- or two-syllable words. Nouns are arranged into either head-first or head-last noun phrases. Relative clauses and genitive phrases precede nouns, whereas markers for demonstratives, definiteness, number, case, and other particles follow the noun. Lepcha is an ergative language, where the ergative case indicates transitivity and completedness of the event. There is no grammatical agreement between different parts of speech (i.e. verb conjugation). Adjectives follow nouns they modify, function as predicates, or stand independently as nominal heads. Adverbs generally directly precede verbs, and reduplication is generally productive for adverbs of time (e.g. nám, "year" → nám-nám, "yearly").

Nouns
According to Plaisier (2007), Lepcha has only two true "cases" that modify the noun morphologically: the definite article -re and the dative case marker -m. All other noun markers, including for example the genitive marker, are actually invariable postpositions. A series noun markers may follow a single noun. Together, these cases and postpositions are:

Plurals are marked differently according to whether they are human (-sang) or non-human (-pong) nouns. Notably, the plural is not used when the noun is followed by a number.

According to Plaisier (2007), Lepcha personal pronouns are as follows:

Oblique forms appear in italics above. Lepcha personal pronouns can refer only to humans; otherwise demonstratives are used. Personal pronouns may take the definite article -re.

Thematic classes
Many Lepcha nouns can be grouped into one of several classes based on associated characteristics. For example, many animal names begin with the Lepcha script syllabic /sâ/: ᰠᰲᰶ sâr means "goat," ᰠᰶᰛᰤᰨᰮ sâryom means "otter," ᰠᰶᰜᰩᰭ sâlók means "rhinoceros," and ᰠᰝᰪ sâhu means "monkey." Other noun classes include /sâ/ and /ka/ for plants, and /pe/ or /pâ/ for snakes and bamboo products.

Verbs
Lepcha verbs generally function as predicates or, in relative clauses, as modifiers before a head-noun. Verbs may also be nominalized by a combination of suffixes. For example, zo, "eat," may be suffixed to produce zo-shang-re, "eating."

Many intransitive verbs incorporate a causative -/y/- infix, sometimes followed by a -/t/ suffix, to take a transitive sense: ᰕᰦᰭ mák, "die" → ᰕᰤᰦᰭ myák, "kill;" ᰏᰶ plâ, "come forth" → ᰏᰤᰶ plyâ, "bring forth;" ᰄᰫ glú, "fall down" → ᰄᰤᰳ/ᰄᰤᰬᰳ glyat/glyet, "drop."

Verbs are followed by grammatical suffixes and particles. Verbal particles indicating sureness, polite requests, authoritativeness, dubiousness, and other nonlexical information follow clauses. Below is a chart of such verb- and clause-final suffixes and particles largely following Plaisier (2007):

Verbs are negated by a circumfix, ma–n(e): khut, "to be able," becomes ma-khut-ne, "to be unable."

Vocabulary 
According to freelang.net

See also

Lepcha script
Sikkimese Tibetan language
Languages of Nepal
Languages of India
Languages of Bhutan

References

Further reading

Bodish languages
Languages of Sikkim
Languages of Nepal
Languages of Bhutan
Unclassified Sino-Tibetan languages
Languages of Koshi Province